Let Me At Em is the first album by the Christian hip hop group Hostyle Gospel. Hostyle Gospel Ministries released this project on May 30, 2007.

Reception

In an eight star review by Cross Rhythms, David Ashley wrote, "Listen carefully and the beats are innovative and quite a break from the ordinary." The Let Me At Em album gave fans a first look at the group's signature sound described as battle music.

Track listing

Music videos 
 "Mean Mug"

References

External links
 AllMusic

2007 debut albums
Hostyle Gospel albums